Tafeaga Junior Sa'u (born 18 April 1987) is a professional rugby league footballer who plays as a  for the Keighley Cougars in RFL League 1. He also plays for Old Glory DC in Major League Rugby (MLR). He previously played for New Zealand and Samoa at the international level.

He previously played for the Newcastle Knights and the Melbourne Storm in the NRL, the Salford Red Devils in the Super League, and the Leigh Centurions in the Betfred Super League. He spent time in 2019 on loan from Salford at Wakefield Trinity in the Super League. Sa'u has also played rugby union for Old Glory DC in Major League Rugby (MLR) in the United States.

Background
Sa'u was born in Auckland, New Zealand to Samoan parents from Lauli'i and Apolima.

He played his junior football for Logan Brothers in Queensland, Australia before being signed by the Canberra Raiders.

Playing career

Early career
He played for Canberra's Premier League team in 2006, scoring seven tries.

Newcastle Knights
Sa'u then signed a four-year contract starting in 2008 to be a part of the newly cleaned out Newcastle Knights.
 
In Round 13 of the 2008 NRL season he made his NRL début for the Newcastle club against the Canterbury-Bankstown Bulldogs. He scored two tries on debut. 

In June 2011, Sa'u re-signed with the Newcastle club for a further two years.

Melbourne Storm
On 18 August 2012, Sa'u was released from the final year of his Newcastle contract and signed with the Melbourne Storm on a one-year contract starting in 2013.

Salford Red Devils
In June 2013, it was announced that Sa'u had signed a two-year deal with Salford in the Super League starting in 2014.

Scoring 12 tries in his début season with Salford, he was voted k'Supporter's Player of the Year' for 2014.

Wakefield Trinity
On 14 May 2019, after five years with the Salford club, Sau joined fellow Super League team Wakefield Trinity on an initial one month loan.

Leigh Centurions
Sa'u joined the Leigh Centurions in the 2019 RFL Championship.

In round 18 of the 2021 Super League season, he scored two tries for Leigh in a 28-34 loss against Hull Kingston Rovers.

Old Glory DC
Sa'u made the switch to rugby union in 2022, joining Major League Rugby side Old Glory DC in the United States.

Keighley Cougars
At the conclusion of the 2022 Major League Rugby season Sa'u returned to the United Kingdom and rugby league and signed for League 1 team Keighley Cougars until the end of the 2022 League 1 season.

International career
In 2008, Sa'u was named in the Samoa training squad for the 2008 Rugby League World Cup but did not make the final squad.

In 2009, Sa'u was selected in the New Zealand Kiwis Four Nations squad and made his international début for the Kiwis against Tonga.

In 2010, Sa'u was selected for New Zealand in the 2010 ANZAC Test. He was also again selected in the New Zealand squad for the 2010 Four Nations.

In 2013 Junior played for Samoa in the Pacific Rugby League International against Tonga. He was also called in the 2013 Rugby League World Cup squad to replace the initially selected Roy Asotasi.

Personal life
He is a cousin to former Manly-Warringah Sea Eagles player Steve Matai.

In 2009, Sa'u was praised for coming to the aid of a 15-year-old girl who was being assaulted in Waratah, New South Wales.

References

External links
Salford Red Devils profile
Newcastle Knights profile
SL profile

1987 births
Living people
Cessnock Goannas players
Eastern Suburbs Tigers players
Expatriate rugby league players in Australia
Keighley Cougars players
Leigh Leopards players
Melbourne Storm players
New Zealand expatriate rugby league players
New Zealand expatriate sportspeople in Australia
New Zealand expatriate sportspeople in England
New Zealand national rugby league team players
New Zealand sportspeople of Samoan descent
New Zealand rugby league players
New Zealand rugby union players
Newcastle Knights players
Old Glory DC players
Rugby league centres
Rugby league players from Auckland
Rugby union centres
Rugby union wings
Rugby union players from Auckland
Salford Red Devils players
Samoa national rugby league team players
Samoan sportspeople
Wakefield Trinity players